Herzegovinian may refer to:

 Something of, or related to Herzegovina
 Herzegovinians, regional term for the general population of Herzegovina
 Herzegovinian Croats, term for ethnic Croats from the region of Herzegovina
 Herzegovinian Serbs, term for ethnic Serbs from the region of Herzegovina
 Herzegovinian uprisings, term for several uprisings in Herzegovina
 Herzegovinian Sanjak, an administrative region of the Ottoman Empire
 Herzegovinian Eyalet, an administrative province of the Ottoman Empire
 Herzegovinian Eparchy, a diocese of the Serbian Orthodox Church
 Herzegovinian Radiotelevision, a regional radio and television station in Mostar, Bosnia and Herzegovina
 Eastern Herzegovinian dialect, a dialect of Serbian language. Note that there is no language called "Herzegovinian" (see Languages of Bosnia and Herzegovina)

See also 
 
 Herzegovina (disambiguation)
 Herzegovina Uprising (disambiguation)
 Federation of Bosnia and Herzegovina

Language and nationality disambiguation pages